Channer is a surname. Notable people with the surname include:

Alice Channer (born 1977), British sculptor 
Colin Channer (born 1963), Jamaican writer
George Channer (1843–1905), recipient of the Victoria Cross
Grace Channer (born 1959), African-Canadian artist
Harold Channer (1935–2020), American interviewer on Manhattan Neighborhood Network from 1973 to 2011

References